Crocidophora is a genus of moths of the family Crambidae. The genus was erected by Julius Lederer in 1863.

Species
Crocidophora acutangulalis (Swinhoe, 1894)
Crocidophora amoenalis Snellen, 1890
Crocidophora argentealis Hampson, 1893
Crocidophora bicoloralis Swinhoe, 1906
Crocidophora caffralis Hampson, 1910
Crocidophora coloratalis Tams in Caradja, 1927
Crocidophora craspedalis Hampson, 1913
Crocidophora cuprotinctalis Caradja, 1932
Crocidophora discolorata Swinhoe, 1894
Crocidophora distinctalis Swinhoe, 1894
Crocidophora elongalis Viette, 1978
Crocidophora exstigmalis Hampson, 1903
Crocidophora fasciata (Moore, 1888)
Crocidophora flavicilialis Snellen, 1890
Crocidophora flavofasciata (Moore, 1888)
Crocidophora habisalis (Walker, 1859)
Crocidophora lutusalis Snellen, 1890
Crocidophora nectariphila Strand, 1918
Crocidophora obscuralis South in Leech & South, 1901
Crocidophora pustuliferalis Lederer, 1863
Crocidophora rufalis Hampson, 1893
Crocidophora sepialis Caradja, 1927
Crocidophora serratissimalis Zeller, 1872
Crocidophora tienmushana Caradja & Meyrick, 1935
Crocidophora tuberculalis Lederer, 1863
Crocidophora zonalis Caradja, 1925

Former species
Crocidophora carapina Strand, 1918
Crocidophora kosemponialis Strand, 1918
Crocidophora sinisalis (Walker, 1859)
Crocidophora velialis Gaede, 1917

References

Crambidae genera
Pyraustinae
Taxa named by Julius Lederer